The 1998 Iowa gubernatorial election took place on November 5, 1998. Incumbent Republican Governor of Iowa Terry Branstad did not seek re-election to a fifth term.

To replace him, State Senator Tom Vilsack narrowly won the nomination of the Democratic Party while former United States Congressman Jim Ross Lightfoot, who was previously the Republican nominee for the United States Senate in 1996, won his party's nomination. Lightfoot was the odds-on favorite to succeed Branstad and polling consistently showed him in the lead. However, Vilsack comfortably won the general election, becoming the first Democrat to serve as governor of Iowa in 30 years and only the fifth Democrat to hold the office in the 20th century.

Lightfoot never conceded defeat.

Democratic primary

Candidates
Tom Vilsack, Iowa State Senator
Mark McCormick, former Iowa Supreme Court Justice (1972-1986)

Results

Republican primary

Candidates
Jim Ross Lightfoot, former United States Representative and nominee for the United States Senate in 1996
David A. Oman, telecommunications executive, chief of staff to Governor Terry Branstad
Paul Pate, Iowa Secretary of State

Results

Reform Party primary

Candidates
Jim Hennager
Edward Moses
Jeffrey L. Hughes, Sr.

Results

General election

Results

See also
United States gubernatorial elections, 1998
State of Iowa
Governors of Iowa

References

Gubernatorial
1998
Iowa